James Waite may refer to:

 James Waite (footballer, born 1999) Welsh football midfielder
 Jamie Waite (born 1986), Thai football goalkeeper
 Jimmy Waite (born 1969), Canadian ice hockey coach and goaltender